Aud Blankholm (born 1 November 1947) is a Norwegian nurse and administrator. She was born in Ørsta. She served as Government Director of Personnel from 1990 to 1995. From 2001, she served as Secretary General of the nurses union Norsk Sykepleierforbund.

References

1947 births
Living people
People from Ørsta
Norwegian nurses
Norwegian trade unionists